Abdounia beaugei is an extinct species of requiem shark from the Paleocene and Eocene epochs of the Paleogene period. It is known from North Africa, Europe, and North America.

References

Carcharhinidae
Prehistoric sharks